= Seagull Monument (Sumgait) =

- Qağayı abidəsi
- Interactive map of Seagull Monument
- Location: Sumgait, Azerbaijan
- Coordinates: 40°34′06.9″N 49°37′53.3″E
- Builder: Suleyman Hajiyev
- Height: 13 meters
- Completion date: 1964

The Seagull Monument (Azerbaijani: Qağayı abidəsi) is a landmark located at the entrance of Sumgait, Azerbaijan, along the Baku-Quba highway. The monument is composed of 24 stone blocks stacked in a spiral formation, topped with the wings of a seagull.

== History ==
The monument was designed in 1964 by sculptor Suleyman Hajiyev. Initially, it consisted of 15 stone blocks, created to commemorate the 15th anniversary of Sumgait. It was presented as a gift to the residents of the city. At the time, the word "Sumgait" was inscribed on the monument.

In later years, modifications were made to the structure. The original 15-block design was replaced, and aluminum structural blocks were introduced. The total number of blocks was increased to 24, and the monument now stands at a height of 13 meters.

== Symbolism ==
The Seagull Monument holds various symbolic meanings. The spiral arrangement of the blocks represents the city’s continuous growth and development. The original 15 blocks symbolized both the city’s 15th anniversary and the 15 Soviet republics, reflecting Sumgait’s multicultural identity during the Soviet era. The seagull wings on top emphasize the city’s location by the Caspian Sea, highlighting its connection to the coastal environment.

== Gallery ==
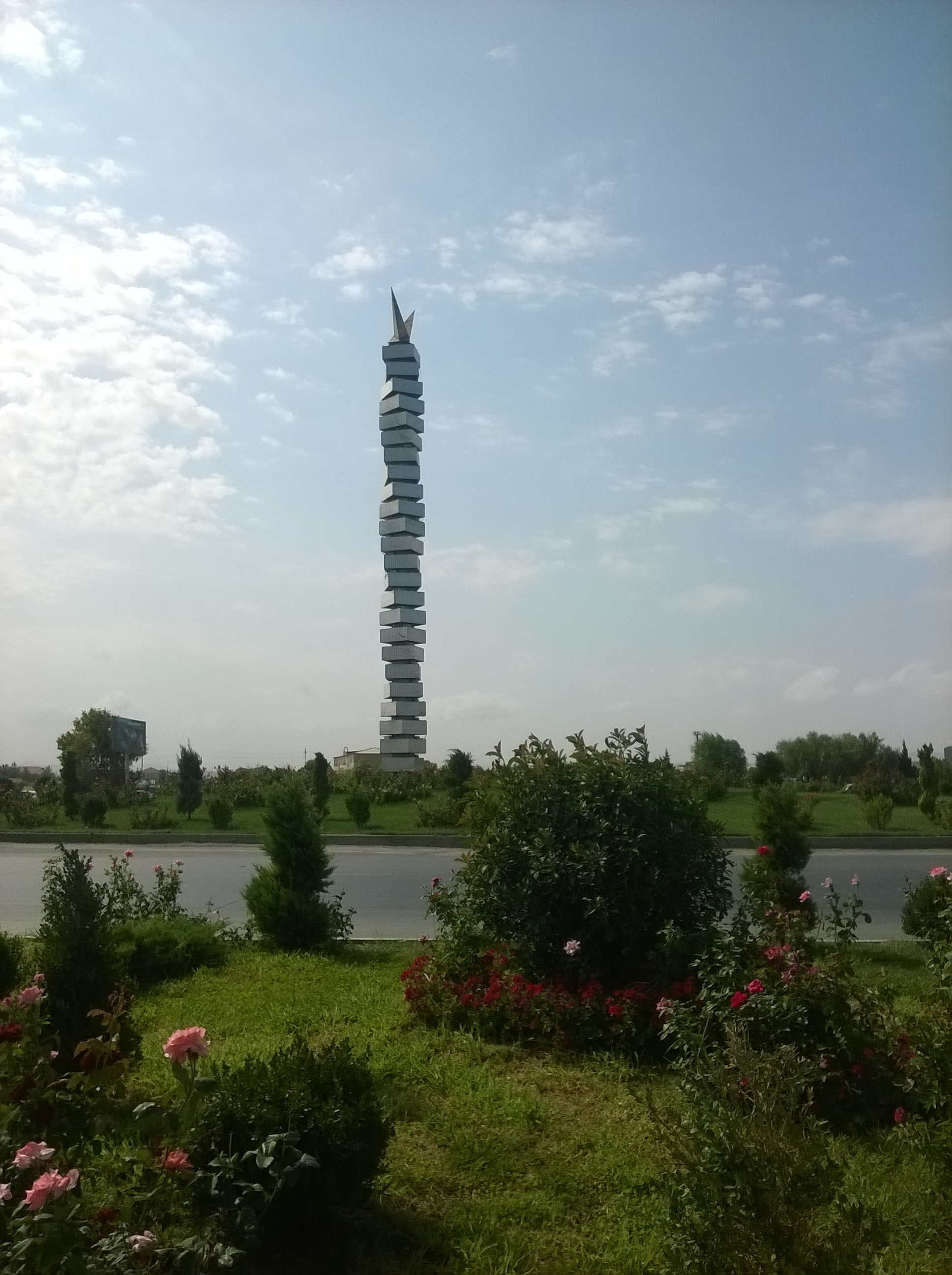

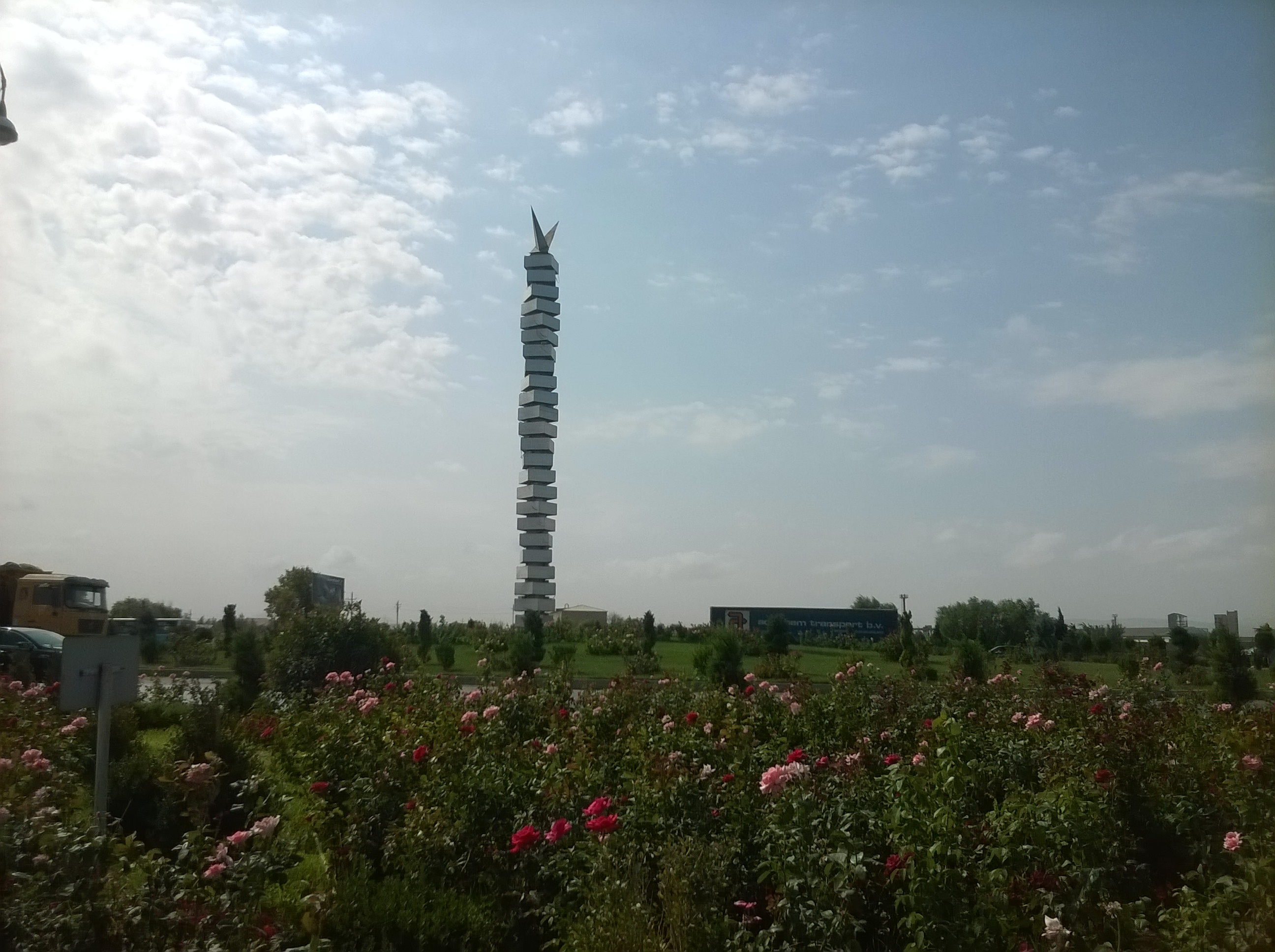
